The 1996 European Championship can refer to European Championships held in several sports:

 1996 European Indoor Championships in Athletics
 1996 European Football Championship
 1996 European Men's Handball Championship
 1996 European Women's Handball Championship
 1996 European Rugby League Championship
 1996 European Amateur Boxing Championships